The Indian Academy of Pediatrics is the association of Indian pediatricians. It was established in 1963, in Mumbai, India and claims to have 23,000 members, as of the year 2013  The head office of IAP is in Mumbai while Delhi is the seat of its official publication – Indian Pediatrics, a MEDLINE indexed medical journal. It also publishes another medical journal called Indian Journal of Practical Pediatrics from Chennai.

In 2017, the IAP was involved in controversy when a pediatrician who had exposed collaborations between vaccine manufacturers was allegedly manhandled at the organisation's annual conference and suspended from the organisation's Advisory Committee on Vaccines and Immunization Practices. The move by IAP has been criticized by other medical organisations like the Alliance of Doctors for Ethical Healthcare (ADEH) and Medico Friends Circle (MFC).

History
In 1948, K. C. Chaudhury founded the Indian Pediatric Society, which later merged with the Association of Pediatricians to form the Indian Academy of Pediatrics (IAP), a single body that would represent Indian pediatricians. The IAP held its first national conference in 1964, in Pune. Its official journal, Indian Pediatrics, first published in Kolkata in 1964, was formed by the integration of the Indian Journal of Child Health  and the Journal of the Indian Pediatric Society.

References

Medical associations based in India
Pediatric organizations
Organizations established in 1963
Pediatrics in India
1963 establishments in Maharashtra